The Surety Building in Muskogee, Oklahoma is an eight-story skyscraper built for the Southern Surety Company in 1910.

It is one of five skyscraper buildings, ranging from five to ten stories tall, built in 1910–1912 and included in the Pre-Depression Muskogee Skyscrapers Thematic Resources study. The others are:
Baltimore Hotel,
Manhattan Building,
Railroad Exchange Building, and
Severs Hotel.

It was individually listed on the National Register of Historic Places in 1986.

General description
The Surety Building was constructed in 1910 in downtown Muskogee, at the corner of Broadway and Third Street by the Southern Surety Company. The approximate cost was $325,000. It was the first building in Eastern Oklahoma to be considered a skyscraper. It was used as offices by government officials, attorneys, petroleum companies, and land developers.

Although the architect is not known, the building's style is classed as Sullivanesque Chicago Style. It is a skeleton-framed rectangular structure with a flat roof. It has the characteristics employed by Louis Sullivan, such as elaborate projecting cornices, ornate two-story base and linteled windows with vertical bands.

Conversion to senior-living apartments
The building was converted into affordable apartments designed for senior living. It contains 18 one-bedroom units and 19 two-bedroom units, which went into service in 2006. Funding for the conversion was provided through the Federal Low Income Housing Tax Credit Program.

References

External links

Skyscrapers in Muskogee, Oklahoma
Residential skyscrapers in Oklahoma
Buildings and structures completed in 1910
Chicago school architecture in Oklahoma